Keasler is a surname. Notable people with the surname include:

Bobby Keasler (born 1945), American football coach
John Keasler (1921–1995), American newspaper columnist
Michael Keasler (born 1942), American judge

See also
Kasler
Kesler
Kessler (name)